Charles Goore (11 December 1701 – 13 March 1783) was an English merchant, slave trader and politician, who twice held the office of Mayor of Liverpool.

Early life 
Charles Goore was born on 11 December 1701, to Richard Goore of Goore House near Ormskirk, Lancashire.  His mother was Alice Mather, the daughter of Thomas Mather of New Hall, Shropshire and Martha Bunbury.
 His wife, Margery Halsall was the great great great niece of Humphrey Chetham, through his brother Ralph Chetham. Charles and Margery resided in a house situated in the churchyard of Church of Our Lady and Saint Nicholas, Liverpool.

Mercantile activity
Goore was part of a consortium of Liverpool merchants who in 1744 invested in Old Noll which they put to work as a privateer.during the War of the Austrian Succession.

Political career 
Goore was a member of the Liverpool Corporation and was known throughout the city for being a successful shipping merchant. He was a founding member of the African Company of Merchants when it was established in 1752 to oversee the slave trade. He was a liberal subscriber to the Bluecoat school and also to the Liverpool Infirmary, of which he became a deputy treasurer upon its completion in 1748. He also donated towards the construction of the now demolished St. Thomas's Church and was appointed one of the commissioners and trustees. In 1747 he was a bailiff before being voted into the position of Mayor of Liverpool, first in 1754 and again in 1768.

Prior to taking his second term as mayor, he issued a statement due to his increasing years in which he announced his support for William Pownall.

The circular is dated 16 October 1767:

The following day, he officially announced his backing for William Pownall:

This appeal was successful and William Pownall was voted into office, however, he died five months later, and on 12 March 1768, Goore was voted to fill in the position for the remaining months.

The following year, Goore was voted as Deputy Mayor during Matthew Strong's term.

Goore died on 13 March 1783, at his home in Liverpool.

Family 
Goore had four children, Charles Mather Goore, who died from Smallpox aged 16 months, Richard Goore, Henry Goore and Elizabeth Goore. His daughter Elizabeth was the only offspring to marry. She married her father's apprentice and future Mayor, Thomas Staniforth.

References 

1701 births
People from Ormskirk
Mayors of Liverpool
1783 deaths
English slave traders